Abarghan or Aberghan or Abraghan may refer to:
 Abarghan, Marand, East Azerbaijan Province
 Abarghan, Sarab, East Azerbaijan Province
 Abarghan, Razavi Khorasan
 Abarghan Rural District, in East Azerbaijan Province